Redmond-Shackelford House is a historic home located at Tarboro, Edgecombe County, North Carolina. It was built in 1885, and is a two-story, three bay Second Empire style stuccoed brick dwelling with a one-story rear wing.  It features concave mansard roofs on both sections with round-arched dormers. The interior features an array of painted and plaster ornament.   The decoration is attributed to Edward Zoeller, a Bavarian fresco painter, who also decorated the Howell Homeplace. Also on the property is a contributing brick kitchen with a hipped roof.

It was listed on the National Register of Historic Places in 1976. It is located in the Tarboro Historic District.

References

Houses on the National Register of Historic Places in North Carolina
Second Empire architecture in North Carolina
Houses completed in 1885
Houses in Edgecombe County, North Carolina
National Register of Historic Places in Edgecombe County, North Carolina
Individually listed contributing properties to historic districts on the National Register in North Carolina